is a Japanese multimedia project. It launched in the March 2016 issue of ASCII Media Works' Dengeki G's Magazine as a serial novel written by Wataru Watari, with illustrations by QP:flapper and Yamcha. A manga series drawn by Yūki Dōmoto is serialized in Dengeki G's Comic, and a 12-episode anime television series by Diomedéa aired from October to December 2016.

Plot
The story revolves around Chitose Karasuma, a voice actress who has been working in the anime industry for a year. Although she believes she is talented, she thinks the anime industry is rotten as she has only been voicing minor characters. One day, an opportunity arises for her to voice a main role in an upcoming anime adaptation of a light novel as an idol voice actress with four other girls.

Characters

Chitose is a university student and aspiring voice actress whose agency is Number One Produce. She is the voice of Yuna, one of the five main heroines in the upcoming anime series Millennium Princess × Kowloon Overlord. She has a positive attitude and high confidence, and initially thinks that she has talent for voice acting but just did not get enough chances. However this is in contrast with her being very cynical. She is nicknamed "Chii-sama".

Yae is an aspiring voice actress at Number One Produce who went to the same voice actress school as Chitose. She is the voice of Mao in Millennium Princess × Kowloon Overlord. She is nicknamed "Yae-pon". Yae is shy and admires Chitose as a fellow voice actress, but sometimes she says some harsh truths without realizing it.

Koto is a 26-year-old voice actress at Number One Produce who speaks in a Kansai dialect who entered the agency at the same time as Gojō. She is also an otaku. She is the voice of Ria in Millennium Princess × Kowloon Overlord.

Momoka is a high school student. She is a musician and idol voice actress at Voice Enterprise. Her father is a famous director and her mother is well-known voice actress Sakura Sonō. She is the voice of Yuzu in Millennium Princess × Kowloon Overlord.

Kazuha is a voice actress at Iroha Production in her late 20s. She wants to be cast in a serious anime series. She is the voice of Nanaka in Millennium Princess × Kowloon Overlord. When drunk, she speaks in her original accent, Yamagata dialect.

A high school student in the same agency as Chitose who greatly admires her.

Kuzu-P (Kuzu Producer) is a producer who is in charge of the planning and production of the anime series Millennium Princess × Kowloon Overlord. He does not seem to care about the quality of an anime as long as money is made.

Gojō is Chitose's older brother and a manager of Number One Produce. He was a talented voice actor, despite one of his drama CDs selling practically nothing. He quit his job as a voice actor after getting a big role.

He is an assistant producer and direct subordinate of Kuzu. Unlike his boss, he is more serious with his job. He often gets dragged into trouble made by Kuzu-P and has to cover up for Kuzu's slacking off.

He is the president of the Number One Produce who has an energetic personality and shares a similar carefree and reckless personality like Kuzu-P. He also shares Kuzu-P's utter indifference to the quality of his company's anime, having begun the novel's plot simply because he was vaguely aware that light novels and adaptations of them were in vogue and therefore decided to try and cash in while he still could.

Media

Print
A serial novel written by Wataru Watari was serialized in ASCII Media Works' Dengeki G's Magazine from the March 2016. to the July 2017 issues. The novel features illustrations by Yamcha, except for the colored pages which are illustrated by QP:flapper, who also provided the original character designs. ASCII Media Works published three volumes from July 27, 2016 to June 26, 2017.

A manga series, written by Watari and illustrated by Yūki Dōmoto, was serialized in ASCII Media Works' Dengeki G's Comic between the April 2016 and July 2017 issues. ASCII Media Works release three tankōbon volumes from July 27, 2016 to June 26, 2017. A spin-off four-panel comic strip manga series, titled  and illustrated by Shin Ikezawa and Yū Tsurusaki, was serialized online by Dengeki G's Magazine from August 15 to November 26, 2016; a single volume was released on November 26, 2016. Another spin-off manga, titled  and illustrated by Mami Surada, was serialized in Dengeki G's Comic from the September to December 2016 issues; a single volume was released on November 26, 2016.

Anime
A 12-episode anime television series, produced by Diomedéa and directed by Shōta Ihata, premiered on October 7, 2016. The opening theme of the first episode is  sung by Kohaluna, a fictional unit made up of Momoka Sonō (Suzuki) and Kazuha Shibasaki (Ōnishi). The series was released on six DVD and Blu-ray compilation volumes from December 21, 2016 to May 26, 2017. The anime has been licensed by Sentai Filmworks, and is streamed by Hulu, Anime Network, and Crunchyroll. Madman Entertainment streamed the series on AnimeLab. MVM Films released the series in the United Kingdom.

An anime adaptation of the Girlish Number Shura manga was announced in April 2017, but TBS and Diomedéa announced the cancellation of the project in November 2018.

Notes

References

External links
  at TBS 
 

2016 Japanese novels
ASCII Media Works manga
Dengeki G's Magazine
Diomedéa
Japanese serial novels
Kadokawa Dwango franchises
Mass media franchises
Seinen manga
Sentai Filmworks
TBS Television (Japan) original programming